is a railway station in the city of Miyako, Iwate, Japan, operated by the Sanriku Railway.

Lines
Miyako Station is a terminal station on the Yamada Line, and is located 102.1 kilometers from the opposing terminus of the line at Morioka Station.  It is also a station for the Sanriku Railway's Rias Line, and was located 92.0 rail kilometers from the terminus of the line at Sakari Station.

Station layout
Miyako Station has two island platforms connected to the station building by a footbridge. The station has a Midori no Madoguchi staffed ticket office.

Platforms

History
Miyako Station opened on 8 November 1934. The station became a terminal station for the Miyako Line on 27 February 1972. This line was privatized on 1 April 1987, becoming the Sanriku Railway Kita-Rias Line. Miyako Station was absorbed into the JR East network upon the privatization of the Japanese National Railways (JNR) on 1 April 1987. The 2011 Tōhoku earthquake and tsunami on 11 March 2011 destroyed much of the tracks and many stations between Miyako and Kamaishi. In February 2012, JR East officially proposed that this section of the line be scrapped and the right-of-way used as a bus rapid transit (BRT) route. Afterwards, this decision was reversed, and as of 2018 the Yamada Line have been reconstructed between Miyako and Kamaishi. On 23 March 2019,it reopened and be transferred to Sanriku Railway, resulting in a one-seat ride between Kuji and Ofunato. The reconstructed segment joined up with the Kita-Rias Line on one side and the Minami-Rias Line on the other which together constitutes the entire Rias Line. At the same time, Miyako station is also transferred to Sanriku Railway.

Passenger statistics
In fiscal 2015, the JR East portion of the station was used by an average of 299 passenger daily (boarding passengers only). The Sanriku Railway portion of the station was used by 247 passengers during the same period.

Surrounding area
 Miyako Post Office 
Jōdogahama

See also
 List of railway stations in Japan

References

External links

  
 Sanriku Railway Station information 

Railway stations in Iwate Prefecture
Yamada Line (JR East)
Railway stations in Japan opened in 1934
Miyako, Iwate
Stations of East Japan Railway Company